Li Juan (born 15 May 1981 in Tianjin) is a female Chinese volleyball player. She was a key part of the gold medal winning teams at the 2005 Asian Championship, 2006 Doha Asian Games and 2010 Guangzhou Asian Games.

Li joined Tianjin Bridgestone in 1998. During more than ten years of professional career, she and her teammates have won eight Chinese Volleyball League titles, two National Games of China titles and three AVC Club Championships titles.

Career

In 2000, Li entered China women's national junior volleyball team.

In 2002, Li was called into China women's national volleyball team for the first time, along with her teammates in Tianjin Bridgestone, Li Shan, Zhang Ping and Zhang Na.

Li participated in the 2008 Beijing Olympics, as a member of China women's national volleyball team, and won the bronze medal.

In the women volleyball final China vs. South Korea of 2010 Guangzhou Asian Games her final strike won the game for China. She won the 2012 Asian Club Championship gold medal.

References
Profile

1981 births
Living people
Chinese women's volleyball players
Olympic bronze medalists for China
Olympic volleyball players of China
Volleyball players from Tianjin
Volleyball players at the 2008 Summer Olympics
Olympic medalists in volleyball
Medalists at the 2008 Summer Olympics
Asian Games medalists in volleyball
Volleyball players at the 2006 Asian Games
Volleyball players at the 2010 Asian Games
Asian Games gold medalists for China
Medalists at the 2006 Asian Games
Medalists at the 2010 Asian Games
Wing spikers